The Razorbacks were a Canadian rockabilly band that attained moderate national popularity in the late 1980s and early 1990s. The band was known for its lively stage show, and made regular appearances on The Tommy Hunter Show on CBC.

History
The Razorbacks were formed in 1986; members were singer/guitarist Tony Kenny, bassist Jail House Joe, drummer Don Dekouchay and Donny Cartwright.  The band began busking and performing in Toronto.

By 1988, The Razorbacks were performing around southern Ontario, and that year they independently released their first album Go to Town. Shortly thereafter the band was signed to Warner Records, which re-released the album.  Singles from the album included “It’s Saturday Night,” which appeared on the RPM Country Singles chart, and “So Much Fun”. The band won the CASBY Award for "Most Promising Group", defeating The Tragically Hip.

The Razorbacks appeared on the Super Dave TV show called Swim Stadium, season 2, episode 9. In December 1989, the band was featured in their own CBC Television Christmas special, It's a Razorbacks Christmas Barbeque. The special, which saw the band performing original Christmas-themed music, also featured special guest Mary Margaret O'Hara, who received a Gemini Award nomination for Best Performance in a Variety or Performing Arts Program or Series at the 5th Gemini Awards in 1990. 

The album Go to Town was re-released in 1997 with four extra tracks.

Discography

Albums

Singles

References

Canadian country rock groups
Musical groups from Toronto
Musical groups established in 1986
Musical groups disestablished in 1996